Briski is a surname. Notable people with the surname include:

Joe Briski (born 1955), American bobsledder
Mariana Briski (1965–2014), Argentine actress, director, producer, screenwriter, author, and professor
Norman Briski (born 1938), Argentine theatre actor, director, and playwright
Zana Briski (born 1966), English photographer, filmmaker, and activist